Vineet Rai is a former Indian Administrative Service officer and Revenue Secretary in the Government of India. Rai was voted one of The 25 Most Powerful women in Business in India in 2020.

Early life
Rai completed her schooling at Sardar Patel Vidyalaya in New Delhi and subsequently studied history at Miranda House, and Brandeis University on a Wien International Scholarship.

Career
An officer of the 1968 IAS batch of the Union Territories cadre, Rai is the first women to hold the post of Revenue Secretary in the Ministry of Finance. She was appointed in June 2003 and held the post till September 2004.

Previously, Rai has held posts in the Ministry of Urban Development, Ministry of Health & Family Welfare and Ministry of Home Affairs in the Union Government.

She also worked in various state administrations and public sector undertakings.

References

External links
 Article on Rediff

Indian civil servants
1944 births
Living people